Andrews Norton (December 31, 1786 – September 18, 1853) was an American preacher and theologian. Along with William Ellery Channing, he was the leader of mainstream Unitarianism of the early and middle 19th century, and was known as the "Unitarian Pope".  He was the father of the writer Charles Eliot Norton.

Biography
In his early career, Andrews Norton helped to establish liberal Unitarianism in New England, and stridently opposed harshly conservative Calvinism and Trinitarianism. Nevertheless, later in life, he became the chief conservative Unitarian opponent of Transcendentalism. As a vocal and well-published theologian, he earned from some the joking title of "the Unitarian Pope".

He was born in Hingham, Massachusetts, son of Samuel Norton.  Norton graduated from Harvard University in 1804 and continued as a graduate student and lecturer there and at Bowdoin College. He was elected a Fellow of the American Academy of Arts and Sciences in 1815. He was named Dexter Lecturer on Biblical Criticism in 1813, and in 1819, Harvard made him the first Dexter Professor of Sacred Literature, a position he held until 1830; he also served as Harvard College Librarian from 1813 to 1821. 

Norton engaged in vigorous debates with George Ripley in 1836 and Ralph Waldo Emerson in 1838 (over Emerson's Divinity School Address). He opposed himself to the rise of Transcendentalism and insisted on the truth of some of the Biblical miracles, while rejecting "most of those in the Old Testament, and a few in the new", including rejecting the virgin birth. In rejecting the virgin birth he went beyond William Ellery Channing.

He died in 1853 in Newport, Rhode Island.

References

External links
Guide to Andrews Norton correspondence with Joanna Baillie at Houghton Library, Harvard University
 Norton page from early-20th-century Cambridge History of English and American Literature
 Norton capsule biography from The Unitarians and the Universalists by David Robinson
 Sermons by Andrews Norton are in the Harvard Divinity School Library at Harvard Divinity School in Cambridge, Massachusetts.

1786 births
1853 deaths
American librarians
American theologians
American Unitarians
Fellows of the American Academy of Arts and Sciences
Bowdoin College faculty
Harvard University alumni
Harvard Divinity School faculty
Harvard University librarians
People from Hingham, Massachusetts